Juana Miguelina González Sánchez (born January 3, 1979 in Laguna Salada, Valverde) is a volleyball and basketball player from the Dominican Republic. She competed for her native country at the 2004 Summer Olympics in Athens, Greece, wearing the number #11 jersey. There, she ended up in eleventh place with the Dominican Republic women's national team. Gonzalez played as a setter.

Career
At the 2000 USA Volleyball Open Championships, playing with the Dominican Dream Team, Gonzalez won the championship and she was selected "All-Tournament".

As a basketball player, she played for her national team in the 2008 Centrobasket tournament, helping her team to win the bronze medal.

Clubs
 Simon Bolivar (2000)
 Modeca (2003)
 Los Cachorros (2004)
 Los Prados (2005)
 Modeca (2006)

Awards

Individuals
 2000 USA Open Championships "All-Tournament Team"
 2006 Central American and Caribbean Games "Best Setter"

References

External links
 FIVB biography
 2006 Central American and Caribbean Games official page
 FIBA profile

1979 births
Living people
People from Laguna Salada
Dominican Republic women's basketball players
Volleyball players at the 2004 Summer Olympics
Olympic volleyball players of the Dominican Republic
Dominican Republic women's volleyball players
Central American and Caribbean Games gold medalists for the Dominican Republic
Competitors at the 2006 Central American and Caribbean Games
Setters (volleyball)
Central American and Caribbean Games medalists in volleyball